Alvan Wentworth Chapman (September 28, 1809 – April 6, 1899) was an American physician and pioneering botanist in the study of flora of the American Southeast. He wrote Flora of the Southern United States, the first comprehensive description of US plants in any region beyond the northeastern states.

Education
He was born in Southampton, Massachusetts, the youngest of five children.  In 1830, he graduated from Amherst College with a degree in classics. He moved to Georgia and then Florida where he held various teaching positions, and married Mary Ann Hancock in 1839.  In the early 1840s, he received a medical education, acquiring his MD in 1846. In 1847, he settled in Apalachicola, Florida, remaining there for the rest of his life working as a physician and botanist, collaborating with Asa Gray.

Botanical works
His botanical interest seems to have started when he lived in Georgia, adjacent to the botanically unexplored regions of northern Florida. Working in near isolation, in his spare time, he had a manuscript by 1859, and visited Harvard University for five months, consulting with Asa Gray and arranging for publication of his Flora of the Southern United States, which occurred in 1860. Chapman brought out a second edition in 1884, and a third edition in 1897.

Memorials

He is memorialized in the genus Chapmannia and a multitude of species names.
Chapman High School and Chapman Elementary School in Apalachicola were named in his honor.
Chapman Botanical Gardens  A beautiful place for reflection and admiring nature, the gardens honor Dr. Chapman.
Chapman House Museum (the fully restored, Greek Revival-style home built in the 1840s by Dr. Alvin Wentworth Chapman in Apalachicola, FL)

Notes

References
Duane Isely, One hundred and one botanists (Iowa State University Press, 1994), pp. 181–183
Raymond B. Becker.  John Gorrie, M.D.: Father of Air Conditioning and Mechanical Refrigeration.  Carlton Press, 1972.  (Contains biographical information about Chapman).
Chapman, A.W. Flora of the Southern United States. Ivison, Phinney and Co., New York. 1860. (Available on Google Books).

External links 

 
 

1809 births
1899 deaths
American botanists
Amherst College alumni
People from Southampton, Massachusetts
Physicians from Florida
People from Apalachicola, Florida